Karim Allawi Homaidi, (born July 1, 1928) is an Iraqi former international football player, who was one of the first players to play in first Iraq national football team, he also played for Al-Minaa.

International career
In April 1951, Allawi started playing for the first Iraq national football team, He was called by coach Dhia Habib to play in the first international friendly in the history of Iraqi football. On 6 May 1951, Allawi played his first international against Turkey B in Turkey, which ended 7–0 for Turkey B. Karim Allawi played in the inside left position and wore the No.10 jersey against the Turks.

Honours

Club
Hanna Al-Sheikh Cup
 Winner 1951 with Al-Minaa

References

External links
  Iraqi national team players database
 Iraq - Record International Players - Hassanin Mubarak
 History of Iraqi Sports, 1951
Al-Minaa Club: Sailors of south

1928 births
Living people
Iraqi footballers
Association football forwards
Al-Mina'a SC players
Sportspeople from Basra
Iraq international footballers